Manuel Parera Penella (7 October 1907 – 12 April 1975) was a Spanish footballer who played for FC Barcelona during the 1920s and 1930s. He scored the club's first ever Primera División goal in 1929.

At the Les Corts stadium, on the second day of the championship. The Barcelona signed the final 1–2, after Madrid came forward with two goals from Tenerife Morera

References

Spanish footballers
1907 births
1975 deaths
La Liga players
FC Barcelona players
Footballers from Barcelona
Association football forwards
Catalonia international footballers